Sabla Wangel Hailu (Amharic: ሰብለ ወንጌል ሀይሉ; 1895/1896 – 1969) was an Ethiopian aristocrat and the second wife of the uncrowned Emperor of Ethiopia, Lij Iyasu.

Name
Sabla Wangel Hailu is frequently confused with her 16th-century ancestor, Empress Sabla Wangel, whom the modern people of Gojjam also believe to have been connected to their region. To differentiate the two famous women, people refer to the earlier queen as Sabla Wangel 'Teleq' (the great) or 'Kedamawit' (the first), while the modern Sabla Wangel is referred to with the suffixes 'Hailu', derived from her father's name, 'Dagmawit' (the second), or 'Tinishi' (the little).

Biography
Sabla Wangel Hailu was born the daughter of Hailu Tekle Haymanot, the ruler of Gojjam, and Askale Mariam Mengesha.

Marriage to Lij Iyasu
At the age of 14, she was selected by the Emperor of Ethiopia, Menelik II, to marry his presumptive heir, Lij Iyasu. The marriage was an alliance between the throne and a powerful Christian family, as well as an attempt to reduce the political influence of Menelik's wife Itege Taytu, as Sabla Wangel had no links to Taytu's family. She was the first of Ras Mengesha's descendents to marry a designated heir to the throne, the second being Medferiashwork Abebe. As Lij Iyasu's first, brief marriage to Romane Werq was probably unconsummated, Sabla Wangel may have been his only official wife.

Sabla Wangel had one daughter with Iyasu, named Alem Tsahai Iyasu. The pair divorced in 1916.

Later life
Sabla Wangel's paternal grandfather, Tekle Haymanot of Gojjam, had rebuilt a church at Mängəśtä Sämayat in 1887. In 1956, Sabla Wangel restored this church once more. The church's founding was associated with the 16th century queen of Lebna Dengel, also called Sabla Wangel. A memorial text written on the modern Sabla Wangel's death in 1969 records:

Family
Father: Hailu Tekle Haymanot (1868–1950)
Mother: Woyzero Askale Mariam
Husbands and their respective issue
Lij Iyasu (1895–1935, div. 1916)
Alem Tsahai Iyasu, married Dejazmach Abebe Asfaw
Dejazmach Yigezu Behabte
Dejazmach Mangasha Jimbirre

Notes

References

Date of birth unknown
1970 deaths
Ethiopian nobility
19th-century Ethiopian women
20th-century Ethiopian women
Empresses and imperial consorts of Ethiopia
Solomonic dynasty
1890s births